Grevillea diffusa is a species of flowering plant in the family Proteaceae and is endemic to the Sydney region of New South Wales. It is a low, compact shrub with elliptic to linear leaves, and dark red, or dark crimson to scarlet and burgundy-coloured flowers.

Description
The flowers are arranged in dome-shaped to more or less spherical groups and are dark red, dark crimson to burgundy-coloured or scarlet, depending on subspecies. Flowering occurs from July to November and the fruit is a glabrous follicle.

Taxonomy
Grevillea diffusa was first formally described in 1827 by Kurt Polycarp Joachim Sprengel in Systema Vegetabilium from an unpublished description by Sieber.
The specific epithet (diffusa) means "spread out".

In 1986, Donald McGillivray described subspecies of G. diffusa in his book New Names in Grevillea (Proteaceae), and in 2000 Robert Owen Makinson described subspecies in Flora of Australia, and the following three names are accepted by the Australian Plant Census:

Distribution and habitat
This grevillea grows in forest or woodland, occasionally in swampy heath and is restricted to Hawkesbury sandstone in the Sydney basin. Subspecies constablei is found south of Sydney from Waterfall to Helensburgh and near the Georges River, subspecies diffusa from the lower Georges River to the Illawarra region and subspecies filipendula between Calga and Mount White, north of Sydney.

References

 
diffusa
Proteales of Australia
Endemic flora of Australia
Flora of New South Wales
Plants described in 1827
Taxa named by Kurt Polycarp Joachim Sprengel